Lee Yong (born 24 December 1986) is a South Korean professional footballer who plays for Korean club Suwon FC and the South Korean national football team as a right-back.

In May 2018 he was named in South Korea's preliminary 28 man squad for the 2018 FIFA World Cup in Russia.

Career statistics

Club
As of 4 March 2023

International
As of 10 June 2022

Honours
Ulsan Hyundai
League Cup: 2011
AFC Champions League: 2012

Sangju Sangmu
K League 2: 2015

Jeonbuk Hyundai Motors
K League 1: 2017, 2018, 2019, 2020
KFA Cup: 2020

Individual
K League 1 Best XI: 2013, 2018, 2019
K League 2 Best XI: 2015

References

External links

 Lee Yong – National Team Stats at KFA 
 

1986 births
Living people
Sportspeople from Ulsan
South Korean footballers
South Korea international footballers
Association football fullbacks
Ulsan Hyundai FC players
Gimcheon Sangmu FC players
Jeonbuk Hyundai Motors players
K League 1 players
K League 2 players
2014 FIFA World Cup players
2018 FIFA World Cup players
2019 AFC Asian Cup players